Stevia plummerae, or Plummer's candyleaf, is a plant species known from Arizona, New Mexico, Chihuahua, Sonora and Durango It is an herb up to 80 cm tall, with white, pink or red flowers.

Synonyms
Stevia plummerae A. Gray, Proc. Amer. Acad. Arts 17: 204–205. 1882.
 Stevia madrensis A. Gray, Proc. Amer. Acad. Arts 21: 382. 1886.
 Stevia plummerae var. durangensis B.L. Rob, Proc. Amer. Acad. Arts 43(2): 29. 1907.

Two varieties are recognized in addition to the autonym, var. plummerae:

Stevia plummerae var. alba A. Gray, Syn. Fl. N. Amer. 1(2): 92. 1884.
Stevia plummerae var. durangensis B.L. Rob., Proc. Amer. Acad. Arts 43(2): 29. 1907

References

plummerae
Flora of Arizona
Flora of Chihuahua (state)
Flora of Sonora
Flora of Durango
Flora of New Mexico
Plants described in 1882